A projective cone (or just cone) in projective geometry is the union of all lines that intersect a projective subspace R (the apex of the cone) and an arbitrary subset A (the basis) of some other subspace S, disjoint from R.  

In the special case that R is a single point, S is a plane, and A is a conic section on S, the projective cone is a conical surface; hence the name.

Definition

Let X be a projective space over some field K, and R, S be disjoint subspaces of X.  Let A be an arbitrary subset of S. Then we define RA, the cone with top R and basis A, as follows :
 When A is empty, RA = A.
 When A is not empty, RA consists of all those points on a line connecting a point on R and a point on A.

Properties

 As R and S are disjoint, one may deduce from linear algebra and the definition of a projective space that every point on RA not in R or A is on exactly one line connecting a point in R and a point in A.
 (RA)  S = A
 When K is the finite field of order q, then  =  + , where r = dim(R).

See also
Cone (geometry)
Cone (algebraic geometry)
Cone (topology)
Cone (linear algebra)
Conic section
Ruled surface
Hyperboloid

Projective geometry